Antonio Smith (born June 12, 1984) is an American football cornerback. He was signed by the Indianapolis Colts as an undrafted free agent in 2007. He played college football at Ohio State.

Smith has also been a member of the Detroit Lions, San Diego Chargers and Cincinnati Bengals.

Biography 
Shortly after finishing his career at Beechcroft High School, he went on to the Ohio State University.

References

External links
Indianapolis Colts bio

1984 births
Living people
Players of American football from Columbus, Ohio
American football cornerbacks
Ohio State Buckeyes football players
Indianapolis Colts players
Detroit Lions players
San Diego Chargers players
Cincinnati Bengals players